The Mavalli Tiffin Rooms (commonly known as MTR) is the brand name of a food-related enterprise in India. Having its origin as a humble mess located on Lalbagh Road in Bangalore, it has ten other branches in Bangalore, as well as one in each of Udupi, Mysore, Singapore, Kuala Lumpur, London and Dubai. MTR created the South Indian breakfast item, Rava Idli. While the packaged foods division was acquired by Orkla of Norway, the MTR chain of restaurants continues to be run by the original family that started it.

History
The Mavalli Tiffin Room was founded as a restaurant by Parampalli Yagnanarayana Maiya and his brothers in the year 1924. In the 1970s, when India was under emergency, a Food Control Act was introduced in 1975 which mandated that food was to be sold at very low prices. This move made it difficult for MTR to maintain high standards in its restaurant business and forced it to diversify into the instant food business, selling ready-to-eat snacks such as chutneys and rasams. Since then, MTR has expanded and diversified, with MTR Department Stores opened next to the restaurant. Currently the MTR brand represents two separate entities; the MTR restaurant business and MTR Foods, the pre-packaged food business.

MTR restaurants
The original MTR restaurant is a vegetarian restaurant located on Lalbagh Road in Bangalore, India founded in 1924. It has been shown on television in the  global travel-related series Globe Trekker. The restaurant building comprises two floors.

MTR serves Karnataka Brahmin food. The decor is outdated. For many years, customers entered the restaurant through the kitchen.

During World War II, MTR found it difficult to make idlis since rice was in short supply. According to MTR, they experimented with semolina instead of rice and thus invented the breakfast item of Rava Idli. MTR was the first fast-food restaurant in the world to serve 21,000 customers in seven hours.

As of today, the MTR restaurants are headed by Hemamalini Maiya, Vikram Maiya, and Arvind Maiya, the grandchildren of Yagnanarayana Maiya.

Silver tumblers are used to serve beverages. This restaurant was closed in the 1975 Indian emergency when the Food Control Act made it unprofitable to serve food items; It reopened in 1981. To save the jobs during the time it was closed, MTR started selling spices and roasted flour mixes. That was the beginning of its entry into the convenience and instant food business.

MTR Foods
MTR Foods was headed by Sadanand Maiya (son of Yagnanarayana Maiya) until it was sold to Orkla, a Norwegian company for US$80 Million in March 2007. It produces packaged foods in different ranges - spices, instant mixes, ready-to-eat foods, vermicelli, beverages, ready-to-cook gravies, range of frozen products, papads, pickles, chips, snacks and ice creams.  After the Kargil War, a lot of changes happened in the packaged ready to eat food segment due to Defence Food Research Laboratory (DFRL). It bought the packaging technology from the same DFRL in Mysore and there are no preservatives added to the food while packaging. MTR is the first Indian processed foods company to be Hazard analysis and critical control points (HACCP)-certified, a standard of food safety and hygiene. It has also sponsored magic shows and theatre performances and given free samples to the audience, as a means of demonstrating their products. MTR Foods created a frozen dosa, which can be heated and eaten right away. MTR Food products are sold online and exported to the countries in the Persian Gulf, United States, and United Kingdom.

See also 
 Cuisine of Karnataka
 Udupi cuisine
 Tiffin
 Rava idli

References

Further reading 
 
 
 
 MTR Opens in Dubai After Singapore

External links

 Webpage of MTR Restaurants
 Webpage of MTR Foods Ltd.
 MTR restaurants in Bangalore

Restaurants in Bangalore
South Indian cuisine
Restaurants established in 1924
Catering and food service companies of India
Orkla ASA
Restaurant chains in India
Indian companies established in 1924